The McNeel Marble Works of Marietta, Georgia, was founded in 1892 by Morgan Louis McNeel and his brother, R. M. McNeel. Its location near the Blue Ridge Mountains provided the firm with access to areas where marble and granite could be quarried. 

The firm is best remembered for the Civil War monuments it constructed in the southern states of the United States.

Selected works

 Chester Confederate Monument (1905)
John Brown Gordon statue, pedestal, Atlanta, Georgia (1907)
 At Rest Arms, Thomaston, Georgia, (1908)
 Comrades"", Statesboro, Georgia, (1909)
 Jasper County Confederate Monument aka Comrades'' Monticello, Georgia, (1910)
Illinois Monument, Kennesaw Mountain, Georgia, (1914)
 Florida's Tribute to the Women of the Confederacy, Jacksonville, Florida, (1915), Allen George Newman, sculptor
 Statue of Sterling Price (1915), Keytesville, Chariton County, Missouri, Allen Newman, sculptor
 Arkansas Memorial at Vicksburg National Military Park, 1954. The memorial was designed by William Henry Deacy.

References

External links
McNeel Marble Company Collection at the Kennesaw State University Archives.

American sculpture
American companies established in 1892
Design companies established in 1892
1892 establishments in Georgia (U.S. state)
Monumental masonry companies
Marble